Rakitovec is a village in the City Municipality of Koper in the Littoral region of Slovenia on the border with Croatia.

The local church is dedicated to Saint James and belongs to the Parish of Predloka.

References

External links

Rakitovec on Geopedia
Rakitovec on Google Maps

Populated places in the City Municipality of Koper